Mary Layne Boas (1917–2010) was an American mathematician and physics professor best known as the author of Mathematical Methods in the Physical Sciences (1966), an undergraduate textbook that was still widely used in college classrooms as of 1999.

Education and career
She received a bachelor's degree (1938) and a master's degree (1940) in mathematics at the University of Washington, and a Ph.D. (1948) in physics at the Massachusetts Institute of Technology.
She taught physics at DePaul University in Chicago for thirty years, retiring in 1987 to return to Washington. Prior to her time at DePaul University, she served as an instructor in the mathematics department at Duke University.

Contributions
In 2005, at the age of 88, Boas published the third edition of her textbook. She established the Mary L. Boas Endowed Scholarship at the University of Washington in 2008 to recognize outstanding academic achievements by female students in physics.

Personal life
Mary Boas was married to mathematician Ralph P. Boas, Jr. Her son, Harold P. Boas, is also a noted mathematician. She died on February 17, 2010, at her home near Seattle, Washington.

References

Further reading

American women physicists
American women mathematicians
American physicists
20th-century American mathematicians
21st-century American mathematicians
American textbook writers
Women textbook writers
Mathematics writers
University of Washington College of Arts and Sciences alumni
MIT Department of Physics alumni
DePaul University faculty
1917 births
2010 deaths
20th-century American women scientists
Mathematicians from Washington (state)
People from Prosser, Washington
20th-century women mathematicians
21st-century women mathematicians
21st-century American women